Owens is a surname representing two separate Celtic ethnicities: the Welsh from ab Owain meaning "son of Owen" (Owen meaning 'noble') with English patronymic-s, and the Irish by the Gaelic surname Mac Eoghain.

This is a list of notable people born with the last name Owens and people who married into the Owens family.

 Bill Owens (baseball) (1901–1999), African-American negro league baseball player
 Bill Owens (Colorado politician) (born 1950), 40th Governor of Colorado
 Bill Owens (Massachusetts politician) (born 1937), African-American Massachusetts businessman and politician
 Bill Owens (New York politician) (born 1949), Representative for New York
 Bill Owens (photographer), American author of Suburbia
 Billy Owens (born 1969), American basketball player
 Billy Owens (American football) (born 1965), American football player
 Bob Owens (businessman) (1921–1999), New Zealand businessman and mayor
 Bob Owens (born c. 1935), American football coach
 Bob Owens (American football, born 1946), American football coach
 Brick Owens (1885–1949), American baseball umpire
 Brig Owens (born 1943), American football player
 Buck Owens (1929–2006), American country music singer
 Candace Owens (born 1990), African-American political commentator
 Casey Owens (c. 1981–2014), United States Marine
 Casey Owens (basketball), American professional basketball coach
 Craig Owens, American musician
 Craig Owens (critic) (1950–1990), American post-modernist art critic, gay activist and feminist 
 Queen Latifah (born Dana Elaine Owens in 1970), African-American rapper/singer and actress
 Darryl Owens (1937–2022), American politician
 Delia Owens (born 1949), American author and zoologist
 Gary Owens (1936–2015), American radio and TV announcer
 Ginny Owens (born 1975), American contemporary Christian music and pop singer/songwriter, author and blogger
 Graeme Owens (born 1988), English footballer
 Greg Owens (born 1981), Australian football player
 Hailey Owens (2003–2014), American murder victim
 Isaac Owens, English footballer
 Isaiah "Ikey" Owens (1974–2014), African-American keyboardist formerly of The Mars Volta
 Jack Owens (singer-songwriter), American singer/songwriter
 Jacob Owens (born 1984), American af2 defensive lineman
 Jay Owens (musician) (1947–2005), African-American blues guitarist, singer and songwriter
 Jerry Owens (born 1981), American baseball player
 Jesse Owens (1913–1980), American Olympic athlete
 Joseph Owens (Jesuit), priest, Caribbean social worker, and author
 Joseph Owens (Redemptorist) (1908–2005), Canadian priest and scholar in medieval philosophy
 Josh Owens (born 1988), American basketball player for Hapoel Tel Aviv of the Israeli Basketball Premier League
 Julie Owens (born 1958), Australian politician
 Keith Owens (born 1969), American basketball player
 Ken Owens (born 1987), Welsh rugby union player
 Ken Owens (basketball) (born 1959), American basketball player and coach
 Lamar S. Owens Jr., American coach and United States Naval Academy quarterback
 Lilliana Owens (1898–1992), American nun, historian and writer
 Lynne Owens (born 1969), British law enforcement officer
 Mary Ann Aspinwall Owens (1928–2005), philatelist of New York
 Mathew Owens (born 1977), Welsh space physicist
 Nancy Fulda (née Owens), American science fiction writer, editor, and computer scientist
 Natasha Owens (born 1976), American Christian musician
 Nigel Owens (born 1971), Welsh international rugby referee
 O'dell Owens (1947–2022), American physician
 Pat Owens, former mayor of Grand Forks, North Dakota
 Patricia Owens (1925–2000), Canadian-born actress in Hollywood films
 Randy Owens (1959–2015), American basketball player
 Richard M. Owens (1876–1932), birth name of Dicky Owen, Welsh international rugby player
 Rick Owens (born 1962), American fashion designer
 Robert Owens (composer) (1925–2017), African-American composer, pianist, and actor
 Robert Owens (musician) (born 1961), vocalist on Chicago house records in the 1980s
 Robert A. Owens (1920–1942), United States marine hero of the World War II landing at Bougainville; posthumously awarded the Medal of Honor
 Robert Bowie Owens (1870–1940), American electric engineer who discovered alpha rays
 Robert G. Owens Jr. (1917–2007), United States marine general
 Robyn Owens, Australian applied mathematician and computer scientist
 Sam Owens, American musician and artist
 Samuel Owens (1856–1921), American politician
 Sandra Tayler (née Owens) (born 1973), American short story and children's book writer and blogger
 Steve Owens (American football) (born 1947), American football player and winner of the Heisman Trophy
 Steve Owens (baseball) (born 1965), American college baseball coach
 Terrell Owens (born 1973), American football player
 Tim "Ripper" Owens (born 1967), American heavy metal singer
 Tinker Owens (born 1954), American football player
 William Owens (admiral) (born 1940), former Vice Chairman, Joint Chiefs of Staff, also former CEO of Nortel
 William Owens (Canadian politician) (1840–1917), Legislative Assembly of Quebec for Argenteuil and Senator for Inkerman, Quebec
 William Owens (Navy SEAL) (1980–2017) United States Navy SEALs senior chief petty officer
 William A. Owens (1905–1990), American author
 William C. Owens Jr. (born 1947), Democratic member of the North Carolina General Assembly
 William Claiborne Owens (1849–1925), United States House of Representatives for Kentucky

See also
 Ab Owain
 Ab Owen
 Bowen (surname)
 Bowens (surname)
 Bown
 Bowne
 Bownes
 Owen (name), given name and surname

References

English-language surnames
Surnames of Welsh origin
Anglicised Welsh-language surnames